Robert Anthony Crampsey (8 July 1930 – 27 July 2008) was a Scottish association football historian, author, broadcaster and teacher, described as a "much loved Scottish cultural institution" by The Times.

Early life and career
Crampsey was born in Glasgow. A graduate of the University of Glasgow, Associate of the Royal College of Music and former Head Teacher of St. Ambrose High School in Coatbridge, Lanarkshire. Crampsey was 1965's 'Brain of Britain'. He followed this up eight years later by reaching the semi-finals of Mastermind, choosing the American Civil War as his specialist subject.

He served in the Royal Air Force from 1952 to 1955.

Broadcasting career
Crampsey was a widely respected pundit on BBC Radio Scotland's Sportsound from 1987 until retiring in 2001.

He was also a mainstay of STV's Scotsport. Crampsey was the author and editor of the Now You Know column of the Glasgow Evening Times, where he would answer sporting questions submitted by readers, from April 1972 until 2006.

Honours
Crampsey was a pianist and was an associate of the Royal College of Music. He had a Doctorate in Sports Journalism from Stirling University.

Personal life
His younger brother Frank was a footballer for Queen's Park, the club both brothers supported. He was a keen fan of Somerset County Cricket Club.

Crampsey married Ronnie and they had four daughters together.

Crampsey died, aged 78, on 27 July 2008 with Parkinson's Disease, which he had been diagnosed with several years earlier. His funeral was held on 1 August in Holy Cross RC Church Crosshill, on the southside of Glasgow.

Tributes
Former Sportsound colleague Richard Gordon said of Crampsey:

First Minister of Scotland Alex Salmond responded to the news of Crampsey's death:

Selected bibliography
His most famous football related works are:
The Game for the Game's Sake (The History of Queen's Park Football Club 1867-1967)
The First 100 Years (The Official Centenary History of the Scottish Football League)
Mr. Stein (his best seller)

As well as being an authority on Scottish football, Dr Crampsey wrote a number of books on non-football related subjects including:
The Young Civilian, A Glasgow Wartime Boyhood (1987)
The King's Grocer, Life of Sir Thomas Lipton (1995)

References

1930 births
2008 deaths
20th-century Scottish historians
Scottish Roman Catholics 
Scottish sportswriters
Scottish association football commentators
Schoolteachers from Glasgow
BBC Scotland newsreaders and journalists
Writers from Glasgow
Alumni of the University of Glasgow
Place of death missing
People educated at Holyrood Secondary School